Studio Ekran was a Russian (Soviet Union's until 1991) TV film studio. It was founded in 1968 and produced made-for-TV movies, mini-series and animated cartoons. In 1994, after reorganization of Ostankino TV channel, it was closed.

Alexander Tatarsky's Pilot studio was started from Ekran.

Filmography

Popular films 
 Hello, I'm Your Aunt! (1975)
 People and Mannequins (1974)
 The Twelve Chairs  (1976)
 Little Tragedies (1979)
 All Costs Paid  (1988)

Popular animation works 
 Leopold the Cat (1974–1987)
 A Girl and a Dolphin (1979)
 Very Blue Beard (1979)
 The Wizard of the Emerald City (1974–1975)
 Last Year's Snow Was Falling (1983)
 Investigation held by Kolobki (1986)
 Plasticine Crow (1981)
 KOAPP (1984-1990)
 Vampires of Geon (1991–1992)
 Captain Pronin (1992–1994)
 AMBA (1994–1995)

See also 
 History of Russian animation

External links 
 Studio Ekran at Animator.ru (full filmography here)
 

Film production companies of Russia
Film production companies of the Soviet Union
Soviet animation studios
Russian animation studios
1968 establishments in the Soviet Union
Companies based in Moscow
Mass media companies established in 1968
Mass media companies disestablished in 1994
1994 disestablishments in Russia